The Valencian Community Handball Cup (Spanish: Copa de Balonmano Comunidad Valenciana) is a Spanish annual knockout tournament organized by the Valencian Handball Federation confronting the leading men's and women's handball team in the Valencian Community. It was first held in 2010.

List of finals

Men's tournament

Women's tournament

References

Val
Recurring sporting events established in 2010
Sport in the Valencian Community